Praproče v Tuhinju is a small settlement above the Tuhinj Valley in the Municipality of Kamnik in the Upper Carniola region of Slovenia.

Name
The name of the settlement was changed from Praproče to Praproče v Tuhinju in 1955.

References

External links
Praproče v Tuhinju on Geopedia

Populated places in the Municipality of Kamnik